The 2011–12 Tampa Bay Lightning season was the franchise's 20th season in the National Hockey League (NHL). The Lightning had a brand new logo and jerseys beginning this season.

Off-season
Among the Lightning's offseason deals, they re-signed their first overall pick from 2008, Steven Stamkos, to a five-year contract. They also brought back goaltender Dwayne Roloson with a one-year contract, having acquired him in a trade during the previous season.

The team's home arena, the St. Pete Times Forum, underwent a $35 million renovation that saw additions that included a digital pipe organ and Tesla coils on either side of the main scoreboard that shoot lightning 25 feet.

Regular season
The Lightning opened the season on the road against the Carolina Hurricanes on October 7. Their first home game was October 17 against the Florida Panthers.

In October, the Lightning earned 12 points after going 5–4–2, which put them in eighth place in the Eastern Conference, and third place in the Southeast Division. Steven Stamkos led the team in goals with six, while Marc-Andre Bergeron led the team in points with 12.

Victor Hedman, the second-overall pick in the 2009 NHL Entry Draft, was signed to a five-year contract extension worth $20 million.

As in October, the Lightning earned 12 points in November with a 6–7–0 record for the month, making their overall record 11–11–2. They remained in third place in their division, while falling to 11th in the Eastern Conference. Stamkos continued to lead the team in goals with 16, and also overtook the points lead with 26.

Martin St. Louis was injured during a morning practice on December 8. That night he was expected to play in his 500th consecutive game. St. Louis took a puck to the face from a backhanded shot attempt from a teammate. After being evaluated, St. Louis was reported to have suffered facial and nasal fractures, and was ruled to be out indefinitely. He would return to the ice on December 21, sporting a full metal cage attached his helmet.

The Lightning began December with only one win in six games, but rebounded to earn points in six of the last seven games of the month, giving them a 6–6–1 record in December. Their 17–17–3 record dropped them to 4th in the division and 12th in the conference. Stamkos ended the month with 43 points, and his 26 goals not only led the team, but led the entire league.

The Lightning concluded the regular season having allowed 278 goals (excluding three shootout goals), the most in the League. They also tied the Detroit Red Wings for the fewest shorthanded goals scored, with just two.

Playoffs
The Lightning failed to qualify for the 2012 Stanley Cup playoffs.

Standings

Divisional standings

Conference standings

Schedule and results

Pre-season

Regular season

Player stats

Skaters
Note: GP = Games played; G = Goals; A = Assists; Pts = Points; +/− = Plus/minus; PIM = Penalty minutes

Goaltenders
Note: GP = Games played; TOI = Time on ice (minutes); W = Wins; L = Losses; OT = Overtime losses; GA = Goals against; GAA= Goals against average; SA= Shots against; SV= Saves; Sv% = Save percentage; SO= Shutouts

†Denotes player spent time with another team before joining Lightning. Stats reflect time with Lightning only.
‡Traded mid-season
Bold/italics denotes franchise record

Awards and records

Awards

Records

Milestones

Transactions
The Lightning have been involved in the following transactions during the 2011–12 season.

Trades

Free agents signed

Free agents lost

Claimed via waivers

Lost via waivers

Lost via retirement

Player signings

Draft picks 
Tampa Bay's selections at the 2011 NHL Entry Draft.

See also 
 2011–12 NHL season

References

Tampa Bay Lightning seasons
T
T
Tamp
Tamp